Vahur Murulaid (born 29 November 1967) is an Estonian military personnel (Lieutenant Colonel).

2007–2011, he was the head and deputy head of Estonian Military Academy.

In 2005, he was awarded with Order of the Cross of the Eagle, V class.

References

Living people
1967 births
Estonian military personnel
Recipients of the Military Order of the Cross of the Eagle, Class V